Albert Edward Godderidge (29 May 1902 – 1976) was an English footballer who played in the Football League for Barnsley and Leicester City.

References

1902 births
1976 deaths
English footballers
Association football goalkeepers
English Football League players
Leicester City F.C. players
Barnsley F.C. players
Newark Town F.C. players
Hinckley United F.C. players
Nuneaton Borough F.C. players
Tamworth F.C. players